Miltochrista hololeuca is a moth of the family Erebidae. It was described by George Hampson in 1895. It is found in Bhutan.

References

 

hololeuca
Moths described in 1895
Moths of Asia